Nanarsine senara is a species of moth of the family Erebidae, subfamily Arctiinae. It is found on Java and Borneo.

References

Nudariina
Moths of Asia
Moths described in 1859